Philip David Collins (born 2 June 1960 in Manchester, England) is a former Speedway rider. He once finished runner-up with England in the World Team Cup final in 1984 and third in 1985. He was British Under-21 Champion in 1978. His transfer from Ellesmere Port to Cradley Heath in 1978 for £15,000 was a record transfer fee at the time.

World final appearances

Individual World Championship
 1983 –  Norden, Motodrom Halbemond – 13th – 4pts
 1985 –  Bradford, Odsal Stadium – Reserve – did not ride

World Team Cup
 1984 –  Leszno, Alfred Smoczyk Stadium (with Chris Morton / Peter Collins / Simon Wigg / Neil Collins) – 2nd – 24pts (7)
 1985 –  Long Beach, Veterans Memorial Stadium (with Jeremy Doncaster / Kelvin Tatum / Richard Knight / John Davis) – 3rd – 13pts (2)

World Longtrack Finals

 1981 –  Gornja Radgona 14pts (6th)
 1982 –  Esbjerg 0pts (18th)
 1986 –  Pfarrkirchen 5pts (13th)

Family
Phil has four brothers all of whom were speedway riders, 1976 World Champion Peter, Les who finished second behind defending champion and home town hero Bruce Penhall at the 1982 World Final in Los Angeles, Neil and Stephen. His nephews Aidan and Chris were also riders but have both retired from the sport.
Phil also has three daughters: Grace, Abby and Lilly Collins.

References

External links
Aidan Collins Website
 http://grasstrackgb.co.uk/phil-collins/

Living people
1960 births
British speedway riders
English motorcycle racers
Sportspeople from Manchester
Belle Vue Aces riders
Cradley Heathens riders
Bristol Bulldogs riders
Ellesmere Port Gunners riders
Birmingham Brummies riders
Wolverhampton Wolves riders
Exeter Falcons riders
Individual Speedway Long Track World Championship riders